Davvy Moale (born 23 March 2003) is a Cook Islands international rugby league footballer who plays as a  for the South Sydney Rabbitohs in the NRL.

Playing career
In round 20 of the 2021 NRL season, Moale made his debut for South Sydney against the St. George Illawarra Dragons at Suncorp Stadium in a 50–14 win.

References

External links
South Sydney Rabbitohs profile

2003 births
Living people
Cook Islands national rugby league team players
New Zealand rugby league players
New Zealand sportspeople of Cook Island descent
New Zealand sportspeople of Tongan descent
Rugby league props
South Sydney Rabbitohs players
Rugby league players from Christchurch